The Pan American Junior Women’s Softball Championship is the main championship tournament between national women softball teams in Pan America, governed by the Pan American Softball Federation.

Results

Medal table

Participating nations

External links
Brazilian Baseball Softball Federation

Softball competitions